Walter Hörl (born 1 July 1963) is an Austrian biathlete. He competed in the 10 km sprint event at the 1984 Winter Olympics.

References

1963 births
Living people
Austrian male biathletes
Olympic biathletes of Austria
Biathletes at the 1984 Winter Olympics
People from Saalfelden
Sportspeople from Salzburg (state)